Butifarra Soledeña (sausage of Soledad, Atlántico) is a type of botifarra that has developed into a regional specialty in Colombian cuisine. It is made from ground beef and pork with seasoning and spices. The meat is cut into pieces and boiled. The mixture is encased in intestine and tied off with string into sections. The lengths are boiled. Butifarras Soledeñas are hawked in the street by vendors calling out "buti, buti, buti" while drumming on the metal containers from which they are sold. Butifarras Soledeñas are often offered with fresh squeezed lime juice.

The South American version of botifarra is shorter and almost round. It is a speciality in Colombia in the town of Soledad and also in Barranquilla. Butifarra is a very popular dish eaten with bollo of yuca and lime juice. It is a celebrated tradition of the area. It can be eaten with the casing removed.

The name comes from the words embutido (Spanish for cured sausages and meaning stuffed) and farra (meaning spree or party).

See also
 Bollo
 Queso costeño
 Arroz de lisa
 Suero atollabuey
 Botifarra
 List of sausages

References

Colombian cuisine
Colombian sausages